St Peter's Church is a Catholic church in Huangpu District (formerly Luwan District), Shanghai.

History
The first church to be built on this site was built in 1933 for the students of Aurora University. This church was in the Byzantine style with a central dome and five chapels. During the Sino-Japanese war, many parishioners found refuge in the international settlements and so the number of faithful attending reached three thousand. During the cultural revolution, this church was confiscated and became a cultural centre. A little space was dedicated to religious ceremonies after 1984 and finally the construction of an expressway just in front of the building drove the cultural centre to move and return the building to the diocese.

The building was razed to build a modern one with very colourful stained-glass windows in 1995. The church is on the third floor of the building with chapels on the second floor.

Location 
The church is located on 270 Chongqing Road, near the Xintiandi Metro station, exit 6.

Gallery

External links
Shanghai

Culture in Shanghai
Churches completed in 1995
Roman Catholic churches in Shanghai